Crowley is a fictional character on the American paranormal drama television series Supernatural, portrayed by actor Mark Sheppard, Known as the King of the Crossroads and the King of Hell in Lucifer's absence. Introduced in the fifth season, Sheppard has appeared in a recurring role in every season since then, and was eventually promoted to series regular in the tenth season. His portrayal of Crowley has been met with positive reception from both critics and fans of the series. His name is inspired by Aleister Crowley.

Plot

Season 5
Crowley is introduced mid-way through Season 5 in the episode "Abandon All Hope...", having first been mentioned near the end of the previous episode, "The Real Ghostbusters", when series protagonists Sam and Dean Winchester learn that Crowley—not Lilith, as was previously believed—had been the one who took The Colt from Bela Talbot in the Season 3. In the following episode, they track down and confront him. Although his guards capture the brothers, Crowley uses The Colt to kill his own men before explaining that he shares the Winchesters' goal of them killing Lucifer, as he suspects that Lucifer would kill all demons once he has killed all humans. Crowley gives The Colt to the brothers to use to kill Lucifer and then informs them of Lucifer's location so that they can find him. When The Colt fails to kill Lucifer, Crowley is forced to go on the run to evade retribution from Hell's forces for his betrayal. Learning of the Winchesters' new plan to stop Lucifer by trapping him in his cage in Hell once again using the Horsemen's rings, Crowley again aids the brothers in "The Devil You Know" to help them find Pestilence and retrieve his ring by orchestrating the capture of a high-ranking demonic minion of Pestilence's and ultimately manipulating the demon into revealing Pestilence's location. He then manipulates the Winchesters' long-time ally Bobby Singer to "lend" Crowley his soul in order for them to find Death, with Crowley assuring Bobby that he will rescind his claim on Bobby's soul once Lucifer is imprisoned. It is soon revealed that he wants Bobby's soul to prevent the brothers from killing him after they stop Lucifer. Despite ever-increasing animosity between himself and the rest of the group, Crowley helps Dean recover the final ring from Death.

Season 6
The Season 6 episode "Weekend at Bobby's" reveals that Crowley went back on his promise to Bobby and plans to keep Bobby's soul, telling him that he will give him the ten years left of life customary for Faustian deals before he has him killed and brought to Hell. Eventually, however, Crowley is forced to return Bobby's soul to save his own life. The same episode establishes Crowley's backstory: he had been a 17th-century Scotsman named Fergus MacLeod whose own son, Gavin, hated him as much as he himself hated Gavin. It is also revealed that Crowley has become the King of Hell since Lucifer's imprisonment in the Season 5 finale. Several episodes later, Crowley reveals himself to be manipulating hunters into working for him by capturing monsters. He explains that he wants to interrogate the monsters on how to reach Purgatory—the afterlife of monsters—to be able to harvest the souls there and build his own power. He then coerces Sam and Dean into working for him, too, by claiming that he can restore Sam's missing soul; however, once he is forced to admit that he had lied in saying that he could, the angel Castiel seemingly kills him. It is eventually revealed that Crowley is, in fact, still alive and still trying to find Purgatory in secret; furthermore, he and Castiel have been working together all along to find Purgatory. They learn how to access Purgatory in the season finale, but Castiel reveals that he has no intentions of letting Crowley have any of the Purgatory souls, thus Crowley forms an alliance with Castiel's enemy Raphael. Castiel sabotages their spell to open Purgatory before taking all of the souls therein for himself, and Crowley makes his escape, leaving Raphael to be killed by Castiel.

Season 7
Though reluctant to risk crossing the new god-like Castiel, Crowley once again secretly aids the Winchesters in Season 7 premiere "Meet the New Boss", this time in trying to defeat Castiel. When the Leviathans are released into the world from Castiel's body, Crowley attempts to strike an alliance with their leader, Dick Roman, but Dick scoffs at the idea of an alliance between their kind, instead insulting and threatening Crowley. In response, Crowley orders his demons to refrain from attacking Sam and Dean, to allow the Winchesters to wipe out the Leviathans. When it turns out that Crowley's blood is needed to construct a weapon to kill the Leviathans, he agrees on the condition that they retrieve the other components of the weapon first. Later, Crowley encounters Dick, who makes a deal with Crowley for the demon to give the Winchesters the wrong blood and thus sabotage the weapon. Despite the deal, Crowley gives Sam and Dean his real blood, resulting in Dick's death and the Leviathans' plan unraveling.

Season 8
In Season 8, Crowley breaks off his alliance with the Winchesters and acts as an antagonist towards them, as they seek to seal all demons in Hell forever by completing three trials described in a Word of God tablet about demons. Crowley himself wants to use the tablet to unleash all demons onto Earth, and so hunts the tablet and the only one who can read it—the prophet Kevin Tran—relentlessly, but can only secure one broken-off half of the tablet. He later becomes interested in a tablet on angels as well. In "Taxi Driver", he attempts to sabotage the second trial Sam and Dean are trying to finish, by dragging the deceased Bobby's soul back to Hell where he had it trapped earlier through use of a reaper working for him. He flees when the angel Naomi is about to attack him, and the trial is ultimately completed. However, the episode ends with Crowley successfully capturing Kevin once again, trying to kill him after Kevin proves that he cannot be tricked or threatened into translating the half of the demon tablet. Crowley is thwarted by the intervention of the angel Metatron. Although Kevin takes Crowley's half of the demon tablet with him when he is rescued by Metatron, Crowley now has the angel tablet, having earlier found and taken it in a confrontation between Castiel and Naomi. In the next episode, he begins killing people whom Sam and Dean have saved, threatening to kill them all and undo the Winchesters' life work unless Sam and Dean surrender the whole demon tablet and give up the trials. Crowley is lured into a trap by Sam and Dean in the season finale, at which point they take him prisoner and make him the subject of the final trial: restoring a demon's humanity by injecting him with purified human blood. Although Crowley manages to make a distress call to other demons, the only one who shows up is Abaddon, who attacks Crowley, planning to take over Hell after killing him. Sam saves him from Abaddon and Crowley soon starts showing human emotion from the effects of Sam's blood, but the process is stopped before it is fully completed, as Sam and Dean learn that completing the last trial would require Sam's death.

Season 9
Crowley remains the Winchesters' prisoner in the first half of the ninth season, with them using him for information. He is set free in the episode "Road Trip" when Dean lets him go to help him in saving Sam, and immediately starts trying to defeat Abaddon for rulership of Hell. He stages an elaborate set-up in "First Born" for the purpose of manipulating Dean into taking on the Mark of Cain, which enables Dean to wield the First Blade, the only weapon that can kill Abaddon. Crowley then sets out to find the lost First Blade for Dean to use on Abaddon. At the same time, Crowley is haunted by the memory of almost being cured and eventually turns to injecting himself with human blood to re-experience his lost humanity, later developing an addiction to it. The Winchesters are forced to help him at his most human in his addiction, but while the three of them manage to retrieve the First Blade by working together, Crowley bitterly concedes that Sam and Dean will try to kill him now that he has gotten them the Blade, and takes off with it to prevent that, planning to give it to Dean only once they have found Abaddon. Ultimately, though Crowley and his time-displaced son Gavin fall into Abaddon's clutches in "King of the Damned", he is able to aid Dean in killing her by giving him the location of the First Blade and discreetly tipping him off to her trap for him and Sam. Crowley's increased humanity prompts him to keep Gavin alive in the present to spare him the death he had experienced in his own time, and to reconcile much of their mutually hateful relationship. In the season finale "Do You Believe in Miracles?", Crowley reveals that he has stopped drinking human blood. At the end of the episode, he oversees Dean's transformation into a demon from the Mark and invites the newborn demon to join him.

Season 10
In "Black" and "Reichenbach", Crowley and Dean are living it up away from everything. However, Crowley gets impatient with Dean's refusal to give up his new life and come to Hell with him to rule at his side. To feed the Mark, Crowley sends Abaddon supporters to Dean to kill and has him fulfill a crossroads deal for him by killing a man's wife and is annoyed when Dean kills the man instead. As Dean starts to get too out of his control, Crowley turns on him, calling Sam and letting him know where Dean is in exchange for the First Blade. In "Soul Survivor", Crowley returns to rule of Hell, executing Abaddon supporters, but finds his time with Dean to be causing him problems. To solve this, Crowley saves Castiel and Hannah from the rogue angel Adina and gives Castiel her grace so he can stop Dean by whatever means necessary, whether they be helping cure him or kill him. In "Girls, Girls, Girls", Crowley learns of the demonic brothel run by two of his demons and while disgusted as he finds it "tacky" rather than evil, orders one to track down the witch who destroyed the brothel. Crowley's demons capture the witch despite the Winchesters interference and Crowley is shocked to learn that the witch is his mother, Rowena. In "The Things We Left Behind", Crowley rebuffs Rowena's efforts to bond with him until she reveals that his demon minion Gerald has been trafficking demons to Earth. Crowley kills Gerald to save her, not knowing that Rowena was lying and lets her out of her cell. More of Crowley's backstory is revealed: Crowley's mother conceived him at an orgy and thus he grew up with no father. Rowena was a terrible mother who ended up abandoning him at age eight and never returning despite promising to, something Crowley holds a great deal of resentment towards her for. In "The Hunter Games", Crowley continues to let Rowena roam free, but mistrusts her. Rowena plots against Crowley, making him have nightmares of being attacked by his demons and spying on a meeting with the Winchesters where they ask him for the First Blade back to help get rid of the Mark of Cain. Crowley reluctantly goes to retrieve the Blade from where he stashed it in a crypt in Guam with his bones, but discovers it missing. Returning to Hell, he finds that Rowena has killed his loyal demon Guthrie who stole the Blade for her. Crowley believes Rowena's lies about Guthrie and informs the Winchesters he will keep the Blade until they are ready to use it to remove the Mark. In Season 10 Episode 17, inside man, Crowley kicks Rowena out because he learns that she has been plotting against him and has been lying to him.

Season 11
After Sam's attempts to cure Dean of the Mark of Cain, Crowley turns back to his old villainy.  He attempts to 'raise' Amara- a soul-draining young woman who was 'born' when the Mark was removed from Dean- for his own ends, but she soon proves too powerful to control. Lost for better solutions to the threat of Amara, Crowley provides Dean and Sam with a way to communicate with Lucifer in the Cage, but Lucifer subsequently escaped when Castiel, out of desperation against the threat posed by Amara, agrees to act as Lucifer's new vessel himself. Having retaken control of Hell, Lucifer has Crowley act as his 'servant', such as forcing him to clean a floor with a toothbrush, until one of Crowley's remaining followers helps him escape. Attempts to battle Lucifer and the Darkness eventually fail, but they are able to stop the threat by convincing Amara to reconcile with God, her 'brother'.

Season 12
Despite Lucifer being freed from Castiel, he resorts to a random assault on the world, lacking any real plan beyond anger against the world that has 'mistreated' him. Working with Castiel and Rowena, Crowley is able to force Lucifer to keep 'jumping' between vessels, eventually exorcising him from the body of the President of the United States and trapping him back in Nick. He is also forced to send his son Gavin back in time to meet his original death in order to prevent the ghost of Gavin's fiancé Fiona killing more people in the present. Crowley initially plans to use Lucifer as his 'attack dog', having warded Lucifer's body so that he is trapped by his very vessel, but Lucifer feigns compliance so that he can win support from other demons to break the warding and free himself. Lucifer eventually escapes and apparently kills Crowley, something the Winchesters learn about from the British Men of Letters.

In "All Along the Watchtower", Crowley is revealed to have survived by possessing a rat before Lucifer "killed" him. Returning to his usual vessel, Crowley offers his help to defeat Lucifer at which point he promises to personally seal the Gates of Hell, tired of his job as the King of Hell and all of the backstabbing that comes with it. After discovering that the Nephilim's power has opened a rift to an alternate reality where the world has ended, Crowley works with the Winchesters to trap Lucifer in the alternate reality. As the spell requires the sacrifice of a life, Crowley says his goodbyes to the Winchesters before killing himself with an angel blade. Crowley's death completes the spell, but Lucifer is able to kill Castiel before he is trapped in the alternate reality with Mary Winchester.

Characterization
Originally, Crowley is described as "Lilith's right-hand man and King of the Crossroads", with the latter title referencing his role as the leader and "the most powerful" of the crossroad demons, a special subgroup of demons in Supernatural who fulfill the traditional concept of a "deal with the Devil" for one's soul. By the sixth season, Crowley has usurped leadership of Hell, becoming "the undisputed King of Hell". However, executive producer and current series showrunner, Jeremy Carver, explained that Crowley "actually doesn't care for [Hell] much", in contrast to Abaddon, his challenger for the crown in Season 9. Nicholas Knight, an author of various Supernatural supplementary materials, summarized Crowley as "nasty, cocky, brutally honest, and wickedly funny", and wrote that, "If [Crowley] weren't such a bad guy, he'd make one amazing hero—although technically he is a hero to the forces of evil."

Starting in the eighth season finale "Sacrifice", Crowley began exposing a "new emotional vulnerability" due to an unfinished demon-curing ritual performed on him in the episode and a resulting addiction to human blood in Season 9. On this topic, executive producer Robert Singer said that Crowley's secret enjoyment of his temporary sense of humanity influenced the character throughout the ninth season. However, Carver's statement raised the possibility that Crowley might not retain this humanity in Season 10.

Season 12 revealed he occupied his throne as "King Of Hell" because the prince of hell next in line for the throne, Ramiel, has no interest in the title. He gives Crowley the throne under one condition: that he be left alone, forever. Ramiel lived a solitary life fishing until one day, the Winchesters and Castiel go kicking up that nest. As Cass was dying from being impaled with the Lance of Michael, Sam Winchester defeated Ramiel with the Lance of Michael. Crowley saved Castiel by breaking the Lance, therefore breaking the spell the Lance of Michael carried.

Development
Maureen Ryan of the Chicago Tribune disclosed in her October 9, 2009 review of fifth season episode "Fallen Idols" that "the ubiquitous and talented Mark Sheppard" had been cast as the "pivotal" demon character Crowley in the upcoming episode "Abandon All Hope...". Sheppard had previously worked with Supernatural producer and director Kim Manners on The X-Files. Sheppard revealed in an interview with Variety on November 11, 2014 that he and Manners had discussed the possibility of Sheppard appearing on Supernatural, but that Manners had died before Sheppard ultimately landed his role as Crowley. In the same interview, Sheppard also revealed that when reading the script for "Abandon All Hope", he "got the giggles" and took the part partially to honor Manners and partially out of appreciation for the work of writer Ben Edlund, as Edlund had written for Firefly, another show on which Sheppard appeared.

In an exclusive interview with Michael Ausiello on July 15, 2010, series creator Eric Kripke confirmed that Crowley would return in the show's sixth season.

Knight felt that "Crowley's journey on the show has been a bold and ambitious one". On the Season 9 subplot of Crowley's human blood addiction, he wrote that it was "one of the most interesting and unexpected subplots of [the] season...and it left a lasting (and often amusing) impression on viewers." Carver, too, enjoys the character, stating, "He's pure evil, but, in an odd sort of way, we find him likable. He's so much fun to write."

When discussing plots that had been either set up or not resolved by the end of Season 9, Knight cited the developments in Crowley's story, questioning what the character plans to do with the demonic version of Dean he beckoned to in the closing moments of "Do You Believe in Miracles?" He also questioned Crowley's plans for demons at large under his control and how Hell may or may not change.

Reception
Critical response to Sheppard's characterization of Crowley has been largely positive. In a review of the episode "Blade Runners" New York'''s Vulture website, Price Peterson wrote, "This whole enemy-of-my-enemy relationship between the Winchesters and Crowley is one of the most compelling dynamics this series has seen, and as long as Supernatural keeps Crowley constantly on the verge of redemption, I see no end to its emotional rewards." Of the same episode, The A.V. Club member Phil Dyess-Nugent wrote, "Just how terrific is Mark A. Sheppard? There was a time, not so very long ago, when I would have tagged this as a trick question, but Sheppard has been playing Crowley long enough to have gotten comfortable in the part and grateful for the chance to do new things with it, and he carries 'Blade Runners' in the palm of his hand." On io9, Charlie Jane Anders praised Sheppard's "impeccable comic timing, and his ability to sell an entire scene with afew [sic] well-chosen facial expressions."

Fan reaction to Crowley has been described as being positive as well. The character was described as a "fan-favorite" and "one of the most iconic and popular characters on the show" since his first appearance. "He's a villain fans love to hate," Knight wrote, "and no matter how difficult he makes Dean and Sam's lives, viewers are always thrilled by Crowley's devilish ways", adding to Carver's warning that Crowley had not become truly human over the course of his Season 9 story arc, that, "A truly human Crowley is something fans would never really want anyway; it's much more fun rooting for a truly bad'' guy, especially when he's so darn entertaining."

References

Supernatural (American TV series) characters
Fictional demons and devils
Fictional characters who can teleport
Fictional characters who have made pacts with devils
Fictional characters with spirit possession or body swapping abilities
Fictional characters with superhuman durability or invulnerability
Fictional characters with superhuman strength
Fictional murderers
Fictional pansexuals
Fictional Scottish people
Fictional soul collectors
Male characters in television
Television characters introduced in 2009